The Robinson Center is a performance, convention, and exhibition space at Statehouse Plaza in downtown Little Rock, Arkansas.

The most notable architectural feature of the complex is the south façade of the Robinson Center Music Hall, a building constructed in 1939 to a design by Eugene Stern of the local architectural firm Wittenberg & Delony.  It is adorned with columns that echo the Greek Revival style also found in the centerpiece of the plaza, the Old State House Museum. The music hall was added to the National Register of Historic Places in 2007, as the Joseph Taylor Robinson Municipal Auditorium. Additional meeting space complementing Robinson Center's offerings are located to the east of the Old State House, inside the Statehouse Convention Center.

The center is named for Joseph Taylor Robinson, a powerful former U.S. Senator and Congressman and Arkansas governor, and is one of several locations and facilities that bear his name.

The Robinson Center Music Hall and Conference Center is the primary performance space for the Arkansas Symphony Orchestra, traveling productions of popular Broadway plays and musicals, and various concerts throughout the year. It seats 2,222.

The new conference center on the north-facing side of the building overlooks the Arkansas River. It features multiple meetings spaces, ballrooms and a terrace capable of hosting weddings, conferences and conventions for a wide variety of organizations.

Robinson Center is administered by the Little Rock Convention & Visitors Bureau, a city government division which maintains its primary offices inside the Cromwell Building across the plaza from the hall.

See also
List of concert halls
National Register of Historic Places listings in Little Rock, Arkansas

References

External links

Robinson Center page at the Little Rock Convention & Visitors Bureau's LittleRockMeetings.com website
Wicked performance at Robinson Center Music Hall, Little Rock AR
Robinson Center Second Act

Buildings and structures in Little Rock, Arkansas
Performing arts centers in Arkansas
Tourist attractions in Little Rock, Arkansas
Government buildings on the National Register of Historic Places in Arkansas
Theatres on the National Register of Historic Places in Arkansas
National Register of Historic Places in Little Rock, Arkansas